The All India Professionals' Congress (AIPC) is a wing of the Indian National Congress, focused on working professionals and entrepreneurs. It aims to highlight the needs of Indians who are professionally employed while also serving to connect them to the political sphere.

Membership 
AIPC members, called AIPC fellows, have to be adult, resident citizens of India, possessing an Indian Voter ID and filing Indian tax returns, with professional qualifications or practising a profession in India. The members have to affiliate themselves with the basic unit of the AIPC, called a Chapter, located nearest to their residence or workplace.

Work 
The AIPC aims to provide an ecosystem that connects professionals to politics. As a department of the Indian National Congress party, it enables its members to develop social, economic and sectoral policies that serve as inputs to the party's strategy and tactics. Conversely, it enables professionals to gain insight into the political and administrative processes through interactions with the political leadership of the party. Members are also expected to support the party by engaging in specialized research and data analysis in areas of their expertise. The AIPC also facilitates outreach to various national, state, professional and industry institutions and bodies, on both political and professional issues.

The AIPC Rajasthan state unit collaborated with an NGO, Star Foundation, on an initiative called the Blessing Box, that offered food assistance to folk artistes and labourers who were out of work during the COVID-19 pandemic in India.

The AIPC Chhattisgarh and Rajasthan state units helped develop the Indian National Congress' manifesto for the 2022 Uttarakhand state election. Thirty five AIPC teams visited all 70 constituencies, soliciting public opinion on the issues most important in the state and shaping it into concrete policy incorporated in the manifesto.

Policies 
The AIPC mandates that its fellows abide by these policies:

 They should not believe in or practise social discrimination of any sort, and will work to eliminate them in society.
 They believe in an integrated society, with no distinctions based gender, religion, race, caste or socioeconomic status.
 They subscribe to the principles and values of the Indian National Congress, and are committed to democracy, secularism and inclusive growth with social justice.

References

External links 
 Official website
 All India Unorganised Workers Congress

2017 establishments in India
Indian National Congress organisations